The Hicks-Dugan-Deener House is a historic house at 306 E. Center St. in Searcy, Arkansas.  It is a single story wood-frame structure, with a side gable roof, a cross-gable projecting section at the right side, and a four-column Greek Revival gable-topped entrance portico.  Built about 1855, it is one of Searcy's few surviving pre-Civil War houses.  Its first owner, William Hicks, was the son of one of Searcy's first lawyers, Howell Hicks, and served as a lawyer and state representative.  Walter Dugan, the next owner, was a prominent local businessman, owning the local telephone company.

The house was listed on the U.S. National Register of Historic Places in 1985.

See also
National Register of Historic Places listings in White County, Arkansas

References

Houses on the National Register of Historic Places in Arkansas
Greek Revival houses in Arkansas
Houses completed in 1855
Houses in Searcy, Arkansas
National Register of Historic Places in Searcy, Arkansas
1855 establishments in Arkansas